Chapuisat is a surname. Notable people with this surname include:

 Pierre-Albert Chapuisat (born 1948), Swiss footballer and manager
 Stéphane Chapuisat (born 1969), Swiss footballer

French-language surnames